Irina Brown (born Leningrad, Russia) is a theatre and opera director in the United Kingdom, where she has lived and worked for over thirty years. Brown was the Artistic Director of the Tron Theatre in Glasgow from 1996 to 2000, and Natural Perspective Theatre Company, London from 2006 to 2011. She is noted for directing the production of Further Than the Furthest Thing by Zinnie Harris for the Royal National Theatre, The Sound of Music for the West Yorkshire Playhouse, Racine's Britannicus at Wilton's Music Hall and The Importance of Being Earnest at Open Air Theatre, Regents Park as well as Bird of Night by Dominique Le Gendre at the Royal Opera House, Covent Garden and War and Peace for the Scottish Opera/ RSAMD. Brown was the Granada Artist-in-Residence at the University of California, Davis in 2004 and 2008.

Selected Directing Credits
Mate in Three by an acclaimed Italian playwright Vittorio Franceschi
 The Tempest Dream after William Shakespeare
 Speedrun by Isabel Wright (a world premiere)
 The Cosmonaut’s Last Message to the Woman He Once Loved in the Former Soviet Union by David Greig
 The Misunderstanding at the Gate Theatre as part of the Consummate Classics Season; the production was the winner of the Time Out magazine /-01 for London Award 1990
 Marina Tsvetaeva. Poet. Outcast. Actors included Fiona Shaw. Theatre: Royal National Theatre, Cottesloe stage
 The Doll's House' at the Birmingham Rep Theatre
 Blood Libel (the world premiere) by Arnold Wesker, premiered at the Norwich Playhouse
 Romeo and Juliet (Contact Theatre)
 A Midsummer Night’s Dream the 1996 inaugural production for the Southern Shakespeare Festival, Florida, produced my Michael J. Trout
 Our Country's Good'' (Tabakov Theatre, Moscow).

References

http://www.performing-arts.co.uk/irina-brown/

Living people
British theatre directors
Theatre directors from Saint Petersburg
Year of birth missing (living people)